Alice Theresa Lucas born Alice Theresa Stern (6 May 1853 – 3 May 1924) was a British parliamentary candidate in the 1918 General Election. She was the first woman candidate for the Conservative Party.

Life
Lucas was born in Marylebone in 1853 to a Jewish family. Her father was David de Stern in the Portuguese nobility and a co-founder of the investment banking company "Stern Brothers".

She married Colonel Francis Alfred Lucas in 1887. He was a businessman who took to politics and was a member of Parliament. They lived at Stornaway House in Cleveland Row in London from 1898.

In 1918 her husband died in the flu pandemic when he was the prospective Conservative candidate for Kennington. She was chosen to replace him and the election was delayed for a few days because of the change in candidate. This was the first British general election where some women were allowed to vote and she became the first ever woman to be a Conservative Party candidate in a general election. She came second to the Liberal candidate who was the person given approval by the coalition government. If she had have been elected then she would have been the first woman member of parliament in Britain. She did much better than her husband had when contesting this seat but it has been commented "that there is nothing like bereavement, injury or childbirth to commend a candidate to the British electorate."

Lucas died at Stornaway House in London in 1924.

References

1853 births
1924 deaths
People from Marylebone
Conservative Party (UK) parliamentary candidates
Jewish British politicians